Juan José Elhuyar Lubize (15 June 1754 – 20 September 1796) was a Spanish chemist and mineralogist, who was best known for being first to isolate tungsten with his brother Fausto Elhuyar in 1783.

He was born in Logroño, in northern Spain and died in Santafé de Bogotá, New Granada (present-day Colombia) at 42.

External links 
Juan José Delhuyar. Polymath Virtual Library, Fundación Ignacio Larramendi

References

1754 births
1796 deaths
18th-century Spanish chemists
Spanish mineralogists
Discoverers of chemical elements
People from Logroño
Spanish people of Basque descent